David Calvin Belton (born April 6, 1964) is an American politician who has served in the Georgia House of Representatives from the 112th district since 2015.

Personal life 
Belton's wife is Theresa Belton. They have three children. Belton and his family live in Buckhead, Georgia.

References

External links 
 Dave Belton at ballotpedia.org

1964 births
21st-century American politicians
Living people
Republican Party members of the Georgia House of Representatives
People from Morgan County, Georgia